Elections were held in Leeds and Grenville United Counties, Ontario on October 22, 2018 in conjunction with municipal elections across the province.

Leeds and Grenville United Counties Council
The Council consists of the mayors and reeves of the constituent municipalities.

Athens

Augusta

Source:

Edwardsburgh/Cardinal

Source:

Elizabethtown-Kitley

Source:

Front of Yonge

Leeds and the Thousand Islands

Source:

Merrickville-Wolford

Source:

North Grenville

Source:

Rideau Lakes

Source:

Westport

References

Leeds
Leeds and Grenville United Counties